Aaron Yonda (born January 19, 1973) is an American comedian, writer, actor, director, and YouTuber from Menomonie, Wisconsin.

He portrays the title character in Chad Vader: Day Shift Manager, a web serial he co-produced with his friend Matt Sloan, who provides the voice of Chad.

Early life 
Yonda is a graduate of the University of Wisconsin-Eau Claire.

Career 
His short film, The Life and Death of a Pumpkin, swept the Chicago Horror Film Festival awards, receiving "Best Short Film" and "Concept". His shorts have been screened worldwide including the Just for Laughs Festival and the Worldwide Short Film Festival in Toronto.

Yonda is also a member of the comedy troupe Monkey Business Institute in Madison, Wisconsin.

See also
Star Wars parodies

References

External links
 "Blame Society Films" page on Aaron Yonda's website
 

1973 births
American male web series actors
21st-century American male actors
Living people
University of Wisconsin–Eau Claire alumni
American YouTubers
People from Madison, Wisconsin
People from Menomonie, Wisconsin
Comedy YouTubers